Zveglivets is a rural locality (a village) in Nyuksenskoye Rural Settlement, Nyuksensky District, Vologda Oblast, Russia. The population was 79 as of 2002.

Geography 
Zveglivets is located 19 km northeast of Nyuksenitsa (the district's administrative centre) by road. Sovetskaya is the nearest rural locality.

References 

Rural localities in Nyuksensky District